Enemy of the Sun is the fourth studio album by American avant-garde metal band Neurosis. It was originally released on Alternative Tentacles in 1993 and later reissued on Neurot Recordings in 1999. The album was reissued with new cover artwork on April 20, 2010. On February 14, 2012, a fully remastered version was released on vinyl via Relapse Records.

The album opens with a sample from the movie adaptation of The Sheltering Sky.

The cover artwork depicts a statue from Toddington Manor in Gloucestershire, England – the subject is unknown but is most likely Saint Thomas Becket. Simon Marsden is the original photographer.

This album is the last Neurosis album to feature Simon McIlroy.

The track "Cleanse" runs for 26:35 on the original CD and the 1999 reissue. On the 2010 reissue, it was edited down to 15:54.

An episode of the TV series Home Improvement had the character Mark (played by Taran Noah Smith) wearing a T-shirt that featured the album.

Track listing

Personnel 
Neurosis
 Scott Kelly − guitar, vocals
 Steve Von Till − guitar, vocals
 Dave Edwardson − bass, backing vocals
 Simon McIlroy − keyboards, tapes, samples
 Jason Roeder − drums
 Pete Inc. − Live Visual Media

Additional musicians
 Kris Force – violin
 Erika Little – voice
 Paul Lew – horn

Technical personnel
 Neurosis − production
 Billy Anderson − engineering, mixing
 George Horn − mastering
 Michael Whitney − artwork, cover design

Release history

References 

1993 albums
Neurosis (band) albums
Albums produced by Billy Anderson (producer)